"Let's Stick Together" is a blues-based rhythm and blues song written by Wilbert Harrison. In 1962, Fury Records released it as a single.  Harrison further developed the song and in 1969, Sue Records issued it as a two-part single titled "Let's Work Together".  Although Harrison's original song did not appear in the record charts, his reworked version entered the U.S. Top 40.

Several artists subsequently recorded the songs; "Let's Work Together" by Canned Heat (1970) and "Let's Stick Together" by Bryan Ferry (1976) were both chart successes.

Original songs
"Let's Stick Together" is a mid-tempo twelve-bar blues-style R&B song.  According to music writer Richard Clayton, "Harrison probably intended 'Let’s Stick Together' as his follow-up single [to 'Kansas City'], but a contract dispute prevented him from releasing it while his star was in the ascendant". In 1959, "Kansas City", written by Jerry Leiber and Mike Stoller, was a number one hit for Harrison on both the Billboard R&B and Hot 100 singles chart.

In 1962, Harrison recorded "Let's Stick Together" for Fury Records, one of several labels operated by record producer Bobby Robinson, that had issued "Kansas City". Fury pressed the single with two different A-side and B-sides: "Kansas City Twist" (Fury 1059) and "My Heart Is Yours" (Fury 1063). It had been three years since Harrison's last chart appearance and the singles failed to reach the charts.

In 1969, Harrison reworked the song with the title "Let's Work Together". The two songs use the same melody line and structure, but the lyrics differ:
"Let's Stick Together"

"Let's Work Together"

Instrumentally, the 1962 recording is an ensemble piece, while the one in 1969 is a solo performance, with Harrison (credited as the "Wilbert Harrison One Man Band") providing the vocal, harmonica, guitar, and percussion.

Sue Records released "Let's Work Together" as a two-part single that reached number 32 on Billboard's Hot 100 in 1970, however, it did not appear on the magazine's R&B chart.

Canned Heat version

Shortly after the release of Wilbert Harrison's "Let's Work Together", Los Angeles blues-rock band Canned Heat recorded their version of the song.  Unlike their previous singles ("On the Road Again", "Going Up the Country", and "Time Was") that featured vocals and harmonica by Alan Wilson, for "Let's Work Together" Bob Hite provided the vocals, with Wilson adding the slide-guitar parts.  The song was prepared for release as a single in December 1969, but was cancelled due to the popularity of Harrison's single.

In the UK, where Harrison's single failed to generate interest, Canned Heat's version was released in January 1970.  There it became their biggest hit, reaching number two on the UK Singles Chart during a stay of fifteen weeks.  In the US, Canned Heat's "Let's Work Together" was first released on August 3, 1970, on their album, Future Blues.  An American single followed on August 25, 1970, and reached number 26 on the Billboard Hot 100.

Bryan Ferry versions
In 1976 Island Records released a version of "Let's Stick Together" by Bryan Ferry. It became his highest charting solo single, reaching number four in the UK chart on June 27 of that year.  The song is the title track for his album of the same name. Ferry plays harmonica and pianos (electric and acoustic), Chris Spedding on electric guitar, John Wetton on bass, Paul Thompson on drums, Mel Collins on soprano saxophone and the tenor saxophone solo is played by Chris Mercer. The video, featuring the band playing the song, includes an appearance by "sexily seductive" model Jerry Hall, Ferry's girlfriend at the time, who mimes the "mid-riff yelping of an unnamed female backing vocalist [that] only adds to the frenetic edge of lustful excitement", according to AllMusic reviewer Dave Thompson.  The single was to become Ferry’s biggest solo hit in the UK. It was certified Silver by the British Phonographic Industry (BPI).

In 1988 Ferry released a remix of the song as "Let's Stick Together '88", on E.G. Records in the UK and on Virgin Records in Germany. The single reached number 12 in the UK chart on October 29.

References

External links 
 
 

1962 songs
Blues songs
1969 singles
Canned Heat songs
1970 singles
Bryan Ferry songs
1976 singles
1988 singles
Fury Records singles